Opuntia aurantiaca,  commonly known as tiger-pear, jointed cactus or jointed prickly-pear, is a species of cactus from South America. The species occurs naturally in Argentina, Paraguay and Uruguay and is considered an invasive species in Africa and Australia.

It was declared a Weed of National Significance by the Australian Weeds Committee in April 2012, and was reported by the Committee to be the most troublesome of all cactus species in New South Wales and the worst Opuntia species in Queensland. It is currently controlled biologically in Australia using the cochineal insect Dactylopius austrinus, and to a lesser extent by the larvae of two moths, Cactoblastis cactorum and Tucumania tapiacola.

See also
Prickly pears in Australia

References

aurantiaca
Cacti of South America
Flora of Argentina
Flora of Paraguay
Flora of Uruguay
Flora naturalised in Australia
Plants described in 1833